Freeman Johns (born December 20, 1953) is a former American football wide receiver. He played for the Los Angeles Rams from 1976 to 1977 and for the Saskatchewan Roughriders from 1978 to 1979.

References

1953 births
Living people
American football wide receivers
SMU Mustangs football players
Los Angeles Rams players
Saskatchewan Roughriders players